Lechte is a surname. Notable people with the surname include:

 John Lechte (1921–2002), Australian politician
 Robert Lechte (born 1978), Swedish handball player
 Ulrich Lechte (born 1977), German politician

See also
Lochte